All Aglow Again! is a 1960 compilation album (see 1960 in music) by Peggy Lee, arranged by Jack Marshall.

Track listing
1. "Fever" (Eddie Cooley, John Davenport) 	
2. "Where Do I Go from Here?"  (Jerry Bock, Sheldon Harnick)		
3. "Whee Baby" (Alice Larson, Peggy Lee) 	
4. "My Man" (Jacques Charles, Channing Pollock, Albert Willemetz, Maurice Yvain)
5. "You Deserve" (Kenny Jacobson, Rhoda Roberts) 	
6. "Mañana (Is Soon Enough for Me)" (Dave Barbour, Lee) 	
7. "Hallelujah, I Love Him So" (Ray Charles)
8. "You Don't Know" (Walter Spriggs) 	
9. "Louisville Lou" (Milton Ager, Jack Yellen) 	
10. "I'm Lookin' Out the Window" (Traditional) 	
11. "It Keeps You Young" (Larry Coleman) 		
12. "Let's Call It a Day" (Ray Henderson, Lew Brown)

Personnel
 Peggy Lee - vocals

References

Peggy Lee albums
Albums produced by Dave Cavanaugh
1960 compilation albums
Capitol Records compilation albums
Albums arranged by Jack Marshall (composer)